Mustafa Akyol (born 20 February 1972) is a Turkish writer and journalist. He is the author of Islam without Extremes: A Muslim Case for Liberty, long-listed in 2012 for the Lionel Gelber Prize, a literary award for the world's best non-fiction book in English. He became a contributing opinion writer for the International New York Times in 2013. He is mainly famous in the western world for his arguments that Islam is highly compatible with classical liberalism and Enlightenment values, and that Islamic practice and the governance of Muslim-majority countries should be reformed along those lines similar to what previously happened in Christian-majority Europe.

Early life and education
Akyol was born to liberal journalist Taha Akyol and received his early education in Ankara. He later graduated from the Istanbul Nişantaşı Anadolu Lisesi and the International Relations Department of Boğaziçi University. He earned his master's degree in the History Department of the same university with a thesis on Turkey's Kurdish question, which he later extended to a popular book titled Kürt Sorununu Yeniden Düşünmek: Yanlış Giden Neydi, Bundan Sonra Nereye? (Rethinking the Kurdish Issue: What Went Wrong, What Next?)

Career
Akyol has written regular columns for Turkish dailies like Hürriyet Daily News. He has criticized both Islamic extremism and Turkish secularism, which he likened to Jacobinism and fundamentalism.

His earlier articles were often friendly to the incumbent Justice and Development Party, although his later writings criticised the party's governance as having "adopted the very authoritarian habits it used to oppose" and thus having "failed as a model of liberal Islamism."

Over the years, he has given seminars in several universities or think-tanks in the United States and the United Kingdom on issues of Islam, politics, and Turkish affairs. He also spoke at TED, giving a lecture on "Faith versus tradition in Islam".

Akyol is also author of the English-language book Islam Without Extremes: A Muslim Case For Liberty (W.W. Norton). This, according to the publisher, is "a desperately needed intellectual basis for the reconcilability of Islam and religious, political, economic, and social freedoms." Stephen Schwartz critiques the author's lack of full disclosure regarding his own family's Turkish history and involvement in politics. He also faults the author for not carefully laying out the facts surrounding Turkish democracy and rushing to conclusions about the country's AKP political party that are not fully supported by the evidence.

From 2017 to 2018, he was a senior visiting fellow at Wellesley College, and since 2018 has been senior fellow at the Cato Institute.

Intelligent design advocacy
Akyol used to be an outspoken promoter of intelligent design and was identified as a former spokesman for Science Research Foundation (Bilim Araştırma Vakfı), an Islamic creationist group, started by Adnan Oktar. Akyol later noted that he had ended all his "cooperation with [Bilim Araştırma Vakfı]... due to some serious disagreements on issues other than intelligent design." He was also affiliated with the Discovery Institute. He has testified in the Kansas evolution hearings in favor of introducing intelligent design and arranged a government-sponsored intelligent design conference in Istanbul. In 2019, he said he changed his mind, noting that "the theory of evolution is perfectly compatible with the faith."

Works

References

External links
 Yes, We Can! Toward a Brave New Turkey - Mustafa Akyol discusses Turkey's historical and contemporary struggle toward political and cultural modernity at Boston University's 2009 Campagna-Kerven Lecture on Modern Turkey.
 

1972 births
Living people
Turkish columnists
Turkish people of Abkhazian descent
Radikal (newspaper) people
Muslim reformers